Achytonix is a genus of moths of the family Noctuidae.

Species

Former species
 Achytonix epipaschia is now Cosmia epipaschia (Grote, 1883)
 Achytonix praeacuta is now Cosmia praeacuta (Smith, 1894)

References
 Achytonix at funet.fi 
 Natural History Museum Lepidoptera genus database

Hadeninae
Noctuoidea genera